Gelvis Solano (born 1 June 1994) is a Dominican professional basketball player for Reales de La Vega of the Liga Nacional de Baloncesto.

Early life
Solano is the son of Andrés Solano, a former member of the Dominican Republic national baseball team. Like many Dominican kids, he started out playing baseball. At the age of 9, he switched to basketball.

College career
He played four years at Merrimack College from 2012 to 2016 where he finished as all-time second place for points scored.

Professional career
After he finished College in the US, Solano went back to Dominican to play for Reales de La Vega. The team reached the playoffs, but lost in the second round before the semifinals. Then, he played in the second division there for the Enriquillo Rebels and soon gained the nickname as Dominican Westbrook.
His debut in his home country’s top league came with Echagüe de Paraná in 2016/17.  
His career continued with Hunan Jinjian Rice Industry, of the National Basketball League (China). His best match was against Hebei Xianglan Kylins, in which he converted 60 points. Solano recalls that he recorded many steals
Later, he went on to Bergamo Basket 2014, of the Italian Serie A2 Basket before he returned to the Dominican Republic and in the summer of 2018 he became champion with Reales de La Vega.

After evaluating his options, he went on to play for Ciclista Olímpico in Argentina. Olympic came from an opaque performance in the Super 20 and decided to release Sebastián Vázquez, in favor of Solano.

Olímpico closed the regular phase in eleventh position and went against Obras Sanitarias where Olímpico struggled but was able to close the series 3-2. After eliminating Obras, Olímpico focused on Club La Unión, which Solano helped beat 3-0 in the series. Solano had a direct duel with Federico Marín. Gelvis commented on the matter: “I saw that he was celebrating too much in our house and that is disrespectful. I took it a little personal.”

National team
Solano has been a member of the Dominican Republic national basketball team. Gelvis returned to wear the shirt of his country in the AmeriCup, which was played in Uruguay.

At the 2019 FIBA World Cup in China, he was one of the cornerstones of the team that surprisingly beat Germany and advanced to the second round instead of the heavily favored competitor.

References

External links
Profile at RealGM.com
Profile at 2019 Basketball World Cup

1994 births
Living people
Ciclista Olímpico players
Club Athletico Paulistano basketball players
Dominican Republic expatriate basketball people in Argentina
Dominican Republic expatriate basketball people in Brazil
Dominican Republic expatriate basketball people in the United States
Dominican Republic men's basketball players
Merrimack Warriors men's basketball players
Point guards
Sportspeople from Santo Domingo
Szolnoki Olaj KK players